It used to call "Network of Legal Aid Providers Awn",  in March 2013 the member of the network change the name to "Awn Access to Justice Network in Gaza Strip"  AJ Net. Also known as "Awn Network", many people in Gaza prefer to call it  Legal Clinics, it was established by UNDP/PAPP  – Gaza in ِApril-2011. It’s  comprised primarily from organizations that are non-public, non-state civil society actors that are politically unaffiliated.

The Network

In 2012 network members provided legal aid services (awareness, consultation and representation) to more than 23,000 people, of whom 72% were women.
Awn Net has invested heavily in coordination and cooperation within the 20 members of the network by supporting dialogue meetings (including the Legal Task Force), referral mechanisms, the case management system and the legal aid database, while continuing to provide capacity development support to individual network members and working to ensure sustainability of the network.
Awn Network has provided legal services to mainly poor and vulnerable people, to strengthen their access to justice and solve their legal problems at the lowest and simplest level possible.

Legal services provided

Legal services start with legal information and education, giving people knowledge that they have rights under the law and how to exercise them. Such knowledge and confidence can help in solving legal problems without recourse to the courts, a cost-effective and empowering strategy. Where legal remedies are available, this can be the cheapest and simplest form of legal aid, and the one where the greatest resources should be applied.
Legal advice (explaining what the law means and how to exercise it in relation to a concrete problem) is often less costly than providing assistance – understood as helping a person to take legal steps to protect their rights.
Free judicial representation by Awn Network’s legal aid lawyers is only limited to poor individuals who can’t afford paying courts fees or lawyers’ costs.

Statistics for people Benefited from  Awn Access to Justice Network in Gaza Strip, From April 2011 to May 2013.

Legal Aid Clinics

The Awn Network oversees 14 legal aid clinics. There are two types of legal clinics, university/in-campus legal clinics and community legal aid clinics. The community legal aid clinics are based at civil society organizations and aims at providing free of charge legal services to needy people and enhancing access to justice. The purpose of in-campus legal clinics is to encourage students’ engagement with the issues and concerns of the community. In addition, students are exposed to hands-on legal experience and they receive high-quality training on legal skills

Gaza Legal Aid Network Members

The Secretary-General for Awn net is Mr Salama Bseiso 2011-2013, the following NGOs are the main members of the net:
 The Palestinian Bar Association
 Al-Azhar University – Gaza
 Islamic University of Gaza
 University of Palestine – Gaza
 University College of Applied Sciences
 The National Society for Democracy and Law
 The Culture and Free Thoughts Association
 Union of Women Programs Centers (7 branches)
 Women Affairs Center
 Al Atta’ Benevolent Association
 Palestinian Commission for Refugees
 Palestinian Institute for Communication and Development
 Hadaf Center for Human Rights
 Aisha Association for the Protection of Women and Children
 Community Media Center
 Coalition for Justice
 South Women Media Forum
 Center for Women’s Legal Research and Consulting
 El Wedad Rehabilitation Society
 Palestinian Center for Democracy and Conflict Resolution

References

External links
 
 The Official Awn Network Video Channel 
 UNDP  Programme of Assistance to the Palestinian People
 Al-Azhar University Legal Clinic Website 
 The Islamic University Legal Clinic Website 
 Palestinian Bar Association

Legal aid
Gaza Strip